Canton is the largest city in Fulton County, Illinois, United States. The population was 14,704 at the 2010 census, down from 15,288 as of the 2000 census. The Canton Micropolitan Statistical Area covers all of Fulton County; it is in turn, part of the wider Peoria-Canton, IL Combined Statistical Area (CSA).

Geography
Illinois Routes 9 and 78 pass through the downtown together. IL 9 leads east  to Banner near the Illinois River and west  to Bushnell, while IL 78 leads north  to Farmington and south  to Little America in the Illinois River valley.

History
Canton was founded in 1825 by settler Isaac Swan, who believed his new town and Canton, China, were antipodes. 

Tragically, founder Isaac Swan, his infant child, and three other people died in the devastating tornado of June 1835. "Isaac Swan and his child were found in the wreckage of their cabin, the baby dying in its mother's arms," leading some to conclude that the tornado represented divine retribution for the city allowing a circus performance the previous week. The city was hit by a F-3 tornado on July 23, 1975. Two people were killed, and the storm caused major damage to the downtown area.  

Much of the city, particularly the northern portion, has been undermined by room and pillar extraction of coal that took place in the 1800s. 

Central Illinois Energy, a locally financed cooperative, began planning for a corn-fermentation ethanol plant in 2002. Beset by financial problems and construction delays on the plant, the cooperative declared bankruptcy. Central Illinois Energy's assets were bought by a private company. Construction was completed, and the plant began production in the summer of 2008. It was renamed Riverland Biofuels. 

In December 2008, Cook Medical announced that it would open a new medical device factory at the old International Harvester site. Company owner William "Bill" Cook had grown up in Canton and wanted to do something to help revitalize his home town community. Some of the costs related to Cook Medical were planned to be paid for with state funds: a $750,000 Community Development Assistance Program grant from the Illinois Department of Commerce and Economic Opportunity and a $1.1 million grant from the Illinois Department of Transportation for infrastructure improvements near the plant. Scott Eells, the chief operating officer for Cook Group, has said that the factory will eventually be , with more than 300 employees. Bill Cook had previously announced he was buying and renovating several old Canton buildings, including the 1883 Randolph Building on the town square. Cook purchased four buildings in downtown Canton, a shopping center,  the site where the International Harvester plant was located as well as constructing the brand new Canton Harvester Inn boutique hotel and another factory—COOK Polymer. The Lewis Pharmacy Building was purchased and restored. The Randolph Building is another Canton purchase made by Cook. The main floor offers store fronts and there are apartments for rent on the second level. Also purchased is the Fulton Square Shopping Center.

On November 16, 2016, A gas explosion killed an Ameren worker who was fixing a gas leak, sent 12 to the local hospital, and demolished an adjacent building on 1st Avenue that was attached to the Opera House.  The next day the Opera House and two other buildings were declared beyond repair and condemned, an additional building declared uninhabitable until repaired, and 48 other buildings noted as damaged but repairable.

Media
Canton has a daily newspaper, The Daily Ledger, and three radio stations: WBYS and WPZA, and WILP, known as Q98.1. There is also a weekly newspaper, "The Fulton Democrat", and a weekly shopping publication, "The Independent Shopper".

Popular culture
On September 13, 1967, Los Angeles rock band The Doors played a concert at Canton High School.  The Canton audience reportedly reacted with mostly shocked silence at Jim Morrison's stage antics.

Demographics

As of the census of 2000, there were 15,288 people, 5,677 households, and 3,616 families residing in the city. The racial makeup of the city was 89.59% White, 8.85% African American, 0.14% Native American, 0.41% Asian, 0.02% Pacific Islander, 0.44% from other races, and 0.56% from two or more races. Hispanic or Latino of any race were 2.09% of the population.

There were 5,677 households, out of which 28.4% had children under the age of 18 living with them, 48.7% were married couples living together, 11.2% had a female householder with no husband present, and 36.3% were non-families. 32.1% of all households were made up of individuals, and 17.1% had someone living alone who was 65 years of age or older.  The average household size was 2.29 and the average family size was 2.86.

In the city, the population was spread out, with 20.3% under the age of 18, 10.3% from 18 to 24, 31.2% from 25 to 44, 20.0% from 45 to 64, and 18.4% who were 65 years of age or older.  The median age was 38 years. For every 100 females, there were 115.8 males.  For every 100 females age 18 and over, there were 119.4 males.

The median income for a household in the city was $31,011, and the median income for a family was $39,910. Males had a median income of $30,519 versus $20,891 for females. The per capita income for the city was $17,012.  About 10.1% of families and 13.4% of the population were below the poverty line, including 19.9% of those under age 18 and 5.4% of those age 65 or over.

Notable people 

 Granville Barrere (1829–1889), U.S. Representative from Illinois
 Ethan Blackaby (1940–), Major League Baseball outfielder for the Milwaukee Braves
 Tony Blazine (1912–1963), NFL football player (1935–1941)
 Burnett M. Chiperfield (1870–1940), U.S. Representative from Illinois
 Silas B. Cobb, industrialist (born in Vermont)
 William "Bill" Cook (1931–2011), medical device entrepreneur and historic preservationist, founder of the Cook Group
 Dave Downey (born 1941), basketball player for University of Illinois
 Tim Drummond (1941–2015), bass guitarist
 Ralph Dunn (1900–1968), film, television, and stage actor
 Charles Duryea (1861–1938), automobile manufacturer
 Bill Edley (born 1948), Illinois state legislator and businessman
 Lee Eyerly (1892–1963), civil aviation pioneer and amusement ride manufacturer
 Jack Fisk (1945–), Academy Award-nominated production designer and art director
 R. Thomas Flynn (1938–), retired president of Monroe Community College
 James "Boomer" Grigsby (1981–), fullback with the Kansas City Chiefs (2005–2007) and Miami Dolphins (2008)
 Mike Grzanich, pitcher for the Houston Astros
 Harry Jacobs (1937–), linebacker at Bradley University and for the New England Patriots and Buffalo Bills
 Elizabeth A. Kovachevich, United States District Court judge
 Elizabeth Magie (1866–1948), inventor of The Landlord's Game, the precursor to Monopoly
 Louisa McCall (1824–1907), pioneer bank director
 Steven R. Nagel (1946–2014), astronaut
 Barbara Mertz (1927–2013), mystery novelist
 Raymond Phineas Stearns (1904–1970), historian
 Ian Wolfe (1896–1992), television and movie actor, poet

References

External links

 City of Canton official website
 History of Canton Township

 
Cities in Illinois
Cities in Fulton County, Illinois
Micropolitan areas of Illinois
Populated places established in 1825
Peoria metropolitan area, Illinois
1825 establishments in Illinois